Australian rapper Iggy Azalea recorded songs for two studio albums; she is recording one studio album, one reissue, one extended play (EP), and three mixtapes; some of which were collaborations with other artist among other releases. Azalea's first mixtape Ignorant Art, her debut music release, and the project generally credited as her career breakthrough, was released in September 2011; it was recorded in Los Angeles where Azalea had been residing since the previous year after migrating from Australia to the United States in 2006 when she was age 16 to pursue a rap career. Prior to the release of the mixtape, Azalea had shared several home videos on her YouTube channel as an underground rapper. She then aligned herself with Southern rapper T.I., eventually signing with his Grand Hustle imprint in 2012. With plans to release her debut studio album that year, she ended up putting out a free six-song EP titled Glory in July; it includes material slated for the album and recorded during her time in Atlanta. In May 2012, Azalea was featured on Steve Aoki and Angger Dimas' collaborative electronic track "Beat Down". Azalea then announced that she would be releasing her second mixtape in October 2012, TrapGold, produced by Diplo and FKi.

In early 2013, Azalea signed a record deal with Virgin EMI in the United Kingdom, and Def Jam in the United States, both owned by the Universal Music Group. Meanwhile, she was working on her upcoming singles including "Work", "Bounce", and "Change Your Life", featuring T.I. In April 2014, Azalea released her debut studio album, The New Classic, including the songs "Fancy" featuring Charli XCX and "Black Widow" featuring Rita Ora. During that period, Azalea made guest appearances in singles by other artists such as Ariana Grande's "Problem", T.I.'s "No Mediocre" and Jennifer Lopez's "Booty". Later that year, she re-released The New Classic as Reclassified, which featured songs from the original album and five newly recorded tracks, including "Beg for It" featuring MØ and "Trouble" featuring Jennifer Hudson. In 2015, Azalea released "Pretty Girls", a duet with Britney Spears; it appeared on the soundtrack for Furious 7, after making a cameo in the action film Furious 7. Azalea has released "Team", "Mo Bounce", and "Switch" as singles from her second album Digital Distortion. On 7 November 2017, Azalea stated that she is not allowed to release music until January 2018, as she signed with a new label. She also announced the new title of her second album, Surviving the Summer, and put four new tracks for free download via WeTransfer. The media has dubbed the songs as a four-track mixtape or EP called 4 My Ratz. In January 2018, Azalea announced the title of the lead single from Surviving the Summer, "Savior" featuring Quavo, which was released on 2 February 2018. On 5 July, Azalea released two tracks from the EP "Tokyo Snow Trip" and "Kream"; the latter featuring Tyga. Survive the Summer was released on 3 August 2018. On 27 February, Azalea announced that "Sally Walker" would be the first single off the album. On 3 May 2019, Azalea released the album's official second single, "Started". On 24 June 2019, Azalea announced via Twitter that her album In My Defense would be released on 19 July 2019. On 27 September 2019, Azalea announced that she would be releasing a new extended play. In an interview with Entertainment Weekly, Azalea stated that she was not sure if she would tour to promote the record but she plans to begin recording new material in September with hopes of putting it out next year. She later announced on her Twitter that she planned on releasing a new extended play on 15 November 2019 entitled Wicked Lips following the release of its lead single, "Lola"

Songs

Notes

References

 
Azalea, Iggy